The Secret Studio is a 1927 American drama film directed by Victor Schertzinger and written by James Kevin McGuinness. The film stars Olive Borden, John Holland, Noreen Phillips, Ben Bard, Kate Bruce and Joseph Cawthorn. The film was released on June 19, 1927, by Fox Film Corporation.

Cast        
Olive Borden as Rosemary Merton
John Holland as Sloan Whitney 
Noreen Phillips as Elsie Merton
Ben Bard as Larry Kane
Kate Bruce as Ma Merton
Joseph Cawthorn as Pa Merton
Margaret Livingston as Nina Clark
Walter McGrail as Mr. Kyler
Lila Leslie as Mrs. Kyler
Ned Sparks as The Plumber

References

External links
 

1927 films
1920s English-language films
Silent American drama films
1927 drama films
Fox Film films
Films directed by Victor Schertzinger
American silent feature films
American black-and-white films
1920s American films